is a manga series written and illustrated by Rumiko Takahashi. Beginning in Weekly Young Sunday issue 9 of 1987, it was published sporadically until finishing in issue 3/4 of 2007 with the chapters collected into four tankōbon volumes. The story is a fusion of the sports (specifically, boxing) and romantic comedy genres.

Studio Gallop produced an anime original video animation adaptation in 1988. A live-action television drama adaptation starring Kazuya Kamenashi from KAT-TUN and Meisa Kuroki aired for nine episodes in 2008. Viz Media licensed and released the manga and OVA in North America.

Plot
He went pro in only two bouts after leaving high school, and his strong punches are universally recognized by his opponents. While he is a natural at boxing, he can't control his voracious appetite. Not surprisingly, Kōsaku eats anything and everything. As a result, he has been forced to change his weight class since high school. Going from flyweight, all the way up to featherweight, something his trainer tells him he doesn't have the frame for. On top of this he accepts challenges from higher weight classes, giving his coach (and himself) constant trouble.

Into this picture steps , a novice nun who takes Kōsaku on as a personal project, determined to set him on the right path and break his habit of gluttony. She constantly encourages him, making sure that he stays in shape while staying away from food. Unfortunately, closeness can sometimes breed feelings of affection, which Kōsaku begins to develop. Even worse, Sister Angela realizes she is beginning to have the same problems as well.

Media

Manga

Written and illustrated by Rumiko Takahashi, chapters of One-pound Gospel were sporadically published in Weekly Young Sunday between 1987 and 2006. The chapters were collected and published into four tankōbon volumes by Shogakukan from July 5, 1989 to March 5, 2007. It was released in North America by Viz Media, adapted into English by Gerard Jones, with some chapters serialized in Animerica. It was published in both a monthly comic book format and as three volumes mirroring the Japanese tankōbon from 1996 to 1998. The volumes were re-published in 2008, to include the final fourth volume.

Volume list

Other media
One-pound Gospel was adapted into a single 55 minute anime original video animation by Studio Gallop. Directed by Osamu Dezaki, under the alias Makura Saki, it was released on December 2, 1988. The OVA was released by Viz Media on subtitled VHS in 1995. Unlike the manga, Angela is two years older than Kosaku and has a red scooter.

A live-action television adaptation of the manga aired on Nippon TV from January 12 to March 8, 2008. The nine-episode series stars KAT-TUN's Kamenashi Kazuya as Hatanaka Kosaku and Meisa Kuroki as Sister Angela. It was released in a DVD box set on September 3, 2008. A CD containing the music used in the drama was released on February 27, 2008 as One Pound Gospel Original Soundtrack.

Reception 
Shaenon K. Garrity, writing for Anime News Network, stated that despite the unlikely combination of boxing and Catholicism in a situational comedy, Takahashi makes it work. She also called the action scenes "realistic" with proper boxing terminology. Garrity suspected the author was paying tribute to Mitsuru Adachi with the sports comedy and believes that One-pound Gospel appeals to fans of Takahashi's older "slapstick" works, as opposed to her new dramatic works.

References

External links
 One-Pound Gospel at Viz Media
 Official website
 
 One-Pound Gospel at Furinkan.com

1988 anime OVAs
2008 Japanese television series debuts
2008 Japanese television series endings
Boxing in anime and manga
Fictional boxers
Gallop (studio)
Japanese television dramas based on manga
Nippon TV dramas
Romance anime and manga
Seinen manga
Shogakukan manga
Viz Media anime
Viz Media manga
Works by Rumiko Takahashi